Calcasieu is an unincorporated community in Rapides Parish, in the U.S. state of Louisiana.

History
A post office called Calcasieu was established in 1925, and remained in operation until 1960.  According to tradition, Calcasieu was named after an Atakapa chieftain.

References

Unincorporated communities in Louisiana
Unincorporated communities in Rapides Parish, Louisiana